Lee Robert Reno Artoe (March 2, 1917April 1, 2005) was a professional American football player in the National Football League (NFL) and All-America Football Conference (AAFC) for 7 seasons. A tackle, Artoe played for the NFL's Chicago Bears (1940–1942, 1945). In the AAFC, he played for the Los Angeles Dons (1946–1947) and Baltimore Colts (1948).

Artoe played college football at University of Santa Clara, with the
Santa Clara Broncos, and in 1940 was picked in the 11th round by Chicago.
He returned a fumble in the 1942 NFL Championship Game 52 yards for the first score of the game.

Artoe served in the U.S. Navy as a member of the Underwater Demolition Team.

References

External links

1917 births
2005 deaths
Players of American football from Tacoma, Washington
American football tackles
American football placekickers
Santa Clara Broncos football players
California Golden Bears football players
Chicago Bears players
Los Angeles Dons players
Baltimore Colts (1947–1950) players
United States Navy personnel of World War II